Philipp Horn (born 8 November 1994) is a German biathlete. He competed at the Biathlon World Championships 2020.

Biathlon results
All results are sourced from the International Biathlon Union.

World Championships
1 medal (1 bronze)

*During Olympic seasons competitions are only held for those events not included in the Olympic program.

References

External links

1994 births
Living people
German male biathletes
People from Arnstadt
Biathlon World Championships medalists
Sportspeople from Thuringia